Serena Williams successfully defended her title by defeating Maria Sharapova in the final, 6–1, 6–4.

Seeds

Draw

Finals

Top half

Section 1

Section 2

Bottom half

Section 3

Section 4

Qualifying

Seeds

Qualifiers

Lucky losers

Qualifying draw

First qualifier

Second qualifier

Third qualifier

Fourth qualifier

Fifth qualifier

Sixth qualifier

Seventh qualifier

Eighth qualifier

References
 Main Draw
 Qualifying Draw

Mutua Madrid Open - Women's Singles
Women's singles